Claudia MacDonald (born 4 January 1996) is an English rugby union scrum-half who plays for the England national team and club rugby for Wasps Ladies.

International career 
MacDonald made her debut for the England national team coming off the bench against the United States in the 2018 Quilter Internationals.

She played against Wales in the 2019 Women's Six Nations Championship, which England won with a grand slam.

In January 2019, MacDonald was awarded a professional contract with the national team. Later that year, she scored a try in England's Super Series fixture versus the USA. She went on to play 80 minutes in England's victory over Italy in November 2019.

MacDonald was a member of the 2020 Women's Six Nations England squad. She was named in the England squad for the delayed 2021 Rugby World Cup held in New Zealand in October and November 2022.

Club career 
MacDonald played for Sutton & Epsom RFC before joining the Tyrrells Premier 15s side Darlington Mowden Park Sharks in September 2017. In 2018, she moved to Wasps Ladies.

Early life and education 
MacDonald was born in Epsom, Surrey, but her family moved to Dubai in 2008. They spent four years in the Gulf, where her brother Alex represented the Arabian Gulf side. Her second brother, Seb, also played rugby at the Swiegi Overseas Rugby Club in Malta.

Previously a netballer, MacDonald did not start playing rugby until she was 19, but quickly went on to captain her university team at Durham University where she was studying for a degree in economics.

MacDonald was educated privately at St John's School, Leatherhead in Surrey.

She runs a blog, 'Let's Talk 1%', focusing on reducing environmental impact and climate emergency activism. She is also a PADI-qualified rescue scuba diver.

References

External links

 RFU Player Profile

1996 births
Living people
Alumni of Josephine Butler College, Durham
England women's international rugby union players
English female rugby union players
People educated at St John's School, Leatherhead
Rugby union players from Epsom
Rugby union scrum-halves